Nahr may refer to:

Nahr (toponymy), a component of Arabic toponyms literally meaning "river"
Al-Nahr, a Palestinian village
 Non-allelic homologous recombination
 The Arabic term for river, channel (نهر):